Julia de Asensi (4 May 1859 – 7 November 1921) was a Spanish journalist, translator and writer.

Selected works

Stories for adults
The winter evergreen and other narratives. Barcelona: Vincent F. Perelló.
Love and cassock. Madrid: Alonso Gullón, 1878.
Three girlfriends. Madrid: Universal Library, 1880.
Legends and traditions in prose and verse. Madrid: Universal Library, 1883.
Novellas. Madrid: Universal Library, 1889.
Man to Man. Madrid: A. Alonso, 1892.

Short stories for children
Arabal Santiago. Story of a poor child. Madrid: Sons of MG Hernández, 1894.
Auras fall. Stories for children. Barcelona: Antonio J. Bastinos, 1897.
Spring breezes. Stories for children. Barcelona: Antonio J. Bastinos, 1897.
Cocos and fairies. Stories for children. Barcelona: Bastinos, 1899.
Rosa Library. Barcelona: Bastinos, 1901.
Victoria and other stories. Boston: DC Heath and Company, 1905.
Stations. Stories for children. Barcelona: Antonio J. Bastinos, 1907.
Levante mills and other narratives. Barcelona: Perelló and Verges, 1915.

References
 Isabel Díez Ménguez, "Leyendas y tradiciones de Julia de Asensi y Laiglesia: una manifestación más del Romanticismo rezagado", en Anales de Literatura Hispanoamericana, 1999, 28: 1353–1385.
 Isabel Díez Ménguez, Julia de Asensi (1849–1921) Madrid: Ediciones del Orto, 2006.

External links
 
 

19th-century Spanish writers
Spanish women poets
1859 births
1921 deaths
Spanish women journalists
20th-century Spanish writers
Spanish children's writers
Spanish women children's writers
20th-century Spanish women writers
19th-century Spanish women writers
19th-century Spanish journalists
20th-century Spanish journalists
19th-century women journalists